Barger Pond is a lake in Putnam County, in the U.S. state of New York.

Barger Pond was named after the local Barger family.

References

Landforms of Putnam County, New York
Ponds of New York (state)